The Pečovnik Mine is a defunct coal mine near Pečovnik, Slovenia. It is alleged that the site was used as a mass grave and crime scene where Yugoslav Partisans killed 12,000 Croats by forcing them into the mine and covering them with concrete in 1945.

During World War II, the mine worked under the direction of Germans. After the defeat of Third Reich in 1945, Yugoslav partisans captured the mine. Shortly afterward, Josip Broz Tito ordered the Yugoslav Army to close it, although the local community argued that mine still had plenty of coal and was not ready to be closed. Before the mine was closed with concrete on 8–9 May 1945, partisans forced 12,000 Croats to enter it, including 2,000 women and children. The next day, the partisans closed the mine, leaving them underground to die from choking, dehydration, or hunger.

Some local Slovenes were arrested and prosecuted for reportedly giving testimony about the Pečovnik and Matjaževa pits to international journalists.

Roman Leljak, with group of archeologists and historians, made the first investigations and archaeological excavations of victims in the early 1990s. They were supported and financed by the Croatian government until 2000.

See also
 Bleiburg repatriations
 List of massacres in Slovenia
 Tezno massacre
 Barbara Pit
 Huda Jama
 Persecution of Danube Swabians

References 

1945 in Slovenia
Aftermath of World War II in Slovenia
Massacres in Slovenia
Massacres in Yugoslavia
Political repression in Communist Yugoslavia
Mass graves in Slovenia
Yugoslav war crimes
Coal mines
Mass murder in 1945
May 1945 events
Massacres of Croats